Akhmeteli may refer to:

People
Mikheil Akhmeteli (1895-1963), Georgian-German economist
Sandro Akhmeteli (1886-1937), Georgian theater director
Sofia Akhmeteli (born 1981), Georgian alpine skier 
Stepane Akhmeteli (1877-1922), Georgian general

Places
Akhmetelis Teatri (Tbilisi Metro), a metro station in Tbilisi, Georgia